Todd Alan Kluever (born July 6, 1978) is an American stock car racing driver. He raced in all of the top three NASCAR series in the 2000s.

Early career

Kluever began his career by racing motorcycles for over nine years before he moved into full-bodied stock cars at a local track. He raced stock cars in the summer and snowmobiles during the Wisconsin winters. Kluever was the 2000 Rookie of the Year at Dells Motor Speedway in Wisconsin. In 2001, he won the Madison International Speedway Late Model Track Champion, and the Midwest All Racing Series (MARS) Championship and Rookie of the Year. He began racing in the American Speed Association in 2002, and finished 10th in the final points standings. He finished seventh in the 2003 final points standings. In 2004, he had four Top 10 finishes in 13 races, but the series' existence ended during the season. In October 2004, he was given the opportunity to participate in the Race for the Ride at North Wilkesboro Speedway. He beat out 25 drivers to make the final round at Darlington Speedway. He beat out nine other drivers to win the seat in a Roush truck.

NASCAR career

Nextel Cup Series
In 2006, Kluever was slated to race in six NASCAR Nextel Cup events in the No. 06 car during the season in preparation for a full season in 2007, beginning with the 2006 USG Sheetrock 400. However, David Ragan instead replaced the departing Mark Martin in the No. 6 AAA-sponsored Ford full-time in Nextel Cup in 2007.

Busch Series
For the 2006 season, Kluever moved to the Busch Series to drive the Roush Racing No. 06 3M Ford. In 2006, he had four top tens and finished 17th in points. In 2007, he drove 16 races in the Busch Series for Roush Racing, in the No. 16 3M Ford Fusion with Greg Biffle and the No. 26 Dish Network Ford Fusion with Jamie McMurray. He did not race in NASCAR during the 2008 season. For 2009, Kluever drove the Team 42 Racing car at Memphis Motorsports Park, but failed to qualify.

Craftsman Truck Series
In 2005, he drove the No. 50 World Financial Group / Shell Rotella T Ford for Roush Fenway Racing in the Craftsman Truck Series. His 12 Top tens finishes and six top five finishes earned him 11th place in the final points standings and the Rookie of the Year award. In 2009, he ran the Camping World Truck Series race at Gateway in the No. 8 for MRD Motorsports. He finished 12th.

Racing after NASCAR
Kluever went back into racing at local and regional races. He raced in a variety of vehicles such as a IMCA Modified dirt car and in a Midwest Truck Series asphalt truck. In 2021, he raced in the Badger Midget series.

Motorsports career results

NASCAR
(key) (Bold – Pole position awarded by qualifying time. Italics – Pole position earned by points standings or practice time. * – Most laps led.)

Nextel Cup Series

Busch Series

Camping World Truck Series

ARCA Re/Max Series
(key) (Bold – Pole position awarded by qualifying time. Italics – Pole position earned by points standings or practice time. * – Most laps led.)

Images

References

External links

Drivers page at NASCAR.com

1978 births
3M people
American Speed Association drivers
Living people
NASCAR drivers
People from Sun Prairie, Wisconsin
Racing drivers from Wisconsin
ARCA Menards Series drivers
RFK Racing drivers
ARCA Midwest Tour drivers